Nausigaster texana is a species of syrphid fly in the family Syrphidae.

References

Eristalinae
Eumerini
Articles created by Qbugbot
Insects described in 1941
Taxa named by Charles Howard Curran 
Hoverflies of North America